In mathematics, Nakayama's conjecture is a conjecture about Artinian rings, introduced by .

Nakayama's conjecture states that if all the modules of a minimal injective resolution of an Artin algebra R are injective and projective, then R is self-injective.

References

Ring theory
Conjectures